C12-15 pareth-12 (INCI name) is an emulsifier and surfactant commonly used in cosmetics formulations. It is a polyethylene glycol ether formed by combining synthetic C12–C15 fatty alcohols with 12 moles of ethylene oxide.

According to the INCI, "the term Pareth applies to ethoxylated paraffinic alcohols containing both even- and odd-carbon chain length fractions."

References

Cosmetics chemicals
Ethers
Surfactants